Gavdar (also Romanized as Gāvdār) is a village in Liravi-ye Jonubi Rural District, Imam Hassan District, Deylam County, Bushehr Province, Iran. At the 2006 census, its population was 81, in 14 families.

References 

Populated places in Deylam County